Stade Bagnérais is a French rugby union club currently competing at the third level of the French league system (Fédérale 1). They are based in Bagnères-de-Bigorre, a small town of 8,000 inhabitants, in the Hautes-Pyrénées département, at the foot of the Pyrénées.

Formed in 1901 they have reached the final of the French championship twice in 1979 and 1981. Several of their players played for France :

 Center Roland Bertranne who held the French record for most caps (69) for a long time and captained the club to its two championship finals
 Fullback Jean-Michel Aguirre (39), who won France’s second Grand Slam ever in 1977 along with…
 …Wing Jean-François Gourdon (22) 
 Wing Jean Gachassin (21), nicknamed 'Peter Pan' finished his career with them in the 1960s in the town where he was born.

Honours
 French championship : runner-up 1979 (lost to RC Narbonne 0-10), 1981 (lost to AS Béziers 13-22)
 Fédérale 3 champions : 2005

Bagneres-de-Bigorre
Sport in Hautes-Pyrénées
1901 establishments in France
Rugby clubs established in 1901